Pompallier House is a nineteenth-century building located in Russell, New Zealand which once served as the headquarters to the French Catholic mission to the Western Pacific.  It is named after Jean Baptiste Pompallier, the first vicar apostolic to visit New Zealand, who founded a number of missions in the North Island.
Pompallier House is owned and managed by Heritage New Zealand, who open it to the public.  It is New Zealand's oldest Roman Catholic building, oldest rammed earth building, and oldest industrial building.

The mission and printery is open to the public seven days a week, from 10am to 4pm. Access to the building is by guided tour only, with guided tours running four times a day. Garden visit tickets are available to view the Victorian and Edwardian gardens and the hillside parkland walk with views out over the bay. There is also a French Coffee House on site which is open seven days a week from 9am.

History

Construction

In 1836, Bishop Jean Baptiste Pompallier, along with the newly formed French order the Society of Mary (or Marists) received papal approval and were given the mission of Western Oceania. In 1838, Pompallier, along with three of these brothers arrived in Hokianga, on the West Coast of New Zealand, to begin their work in the country. Joined by other members of the order, they moved to the Bay of Islands to set up their headquarters in Kororareka (now Russell).

Bishop Pompallier bought land in Russell in 1839, and the building was constructed in 1841–2. In 1842, it produced its first Māori translations of religious texts.

Unable to bear the cost of purchasing much timber, the missionaries used the rammed earth construction common in Lyon, their original home.  The earth was dug on site and supplemented with sand and rocks from the nearby beaches.  Lime was made by burning shells.  The upper floor was constructed with earth supported by timber frames.  The work was supervised by architect Louis Perret.

There were a number of other buildings on the site, including a chapel, houses, kitchens and other outhouses, but the "Pompallier House" is the only one remaining.

Printing press

The original Gaveaux printing press was brought to the mission from France in the early 1840s; between 1842 and 1849 it printed over 30,000 books and tracts, some of the first in Māori.    After the mission left Russell in 1850 the press was amongst the belongings redistributed.  In 1857 the Waikato Māori asked for the press, which was given to them by Bishop Pompallier.  The press was used by Tāwhiao, the Māori King to print the Māori-language newspaper Te Paki o Matariki.  The press remained in Waikato until the 1990s when it was returned to Pompallier by the Māori Queen Te Atairangikaahu.

While the building was originally built for a printery, it also housed a tannery for book-binding.

Relocation of missionary

In 1850 the mission headquarters moved to Auckland, and in 1856 James Callaghan took over the building, converting it to a residence known as "Callaghan's Castle". It passed through a number of private owners, who altered the original building, until the Government purchased the building in 1941.

In the 1990s, it was fully restored to replicate its early condition. The building contains the original printing press, restored to working order, and the gardens remain as an example of the Victorian and Edwardian gardens typical of the latter owners.

References

External links
 NZ Historic Places: Pompallier

Houses completed in 1842
Museums in the Northland Region
Far North District
Heritage New Zealand Category 1 historic places in the Northland Region
Rammed earth buildings and structures
Houses in New Zealand
History of the Bay of Islands
Historic house museums in New Zealand
Bay of Islands
1840s architecture in New Zealand
Historic homes in New Zealand
Religious buildings and structures in the Northland Region